Pereni is a commune in Rezina District, Moldova. It is composed of two villages, Pereni and Roșcani.

References

Communes of Rezina District